Evian Resort Golf Club is a golf course  in southeastern France, located in Évian-les-Bains, Haute-Savoie. Overlooking Lake Geneva, it hosts The Evian Championship, formerly "Evian Masters," annually in September. From 2013 to 2018, The Evian Championship was the LPGA Tour's fifth and final major championship. It is currently the fourth major of the year.

The entire course, with a particular focus on the tees, fairways, greens, and bunkers, underwent a $8 million renovation in 2012–13, designed by architect Steve Smyers and European Golf Design. The course has received criticism for fundamental design flaws, presenting players with "too many bad breaks with good shots" according to Lexi Thompson, and causing Stacy Lewis to boycott the course for two years. 

References

External links
Course description 

Golf clubs and courses in France
Sports venues in Haute-Savoie